Edward Preble (August 15, 1761 – August 25, 1807) was a United States naval officer who served with great distinction during the 1st Barbary War, leading American attacks on the city of Tripoli and forming the officer corps that would later lead the U.S. Navy in the War of 1812.

Early life

Preble was born at Falmouth, Eastern Massachusetts, now Portland, Maine, on August 15, 1761.  He was the son of General Jedidiah Preble (1707–1784) and his second wife, Mehitable Roberts (née Bangs) Preble (1728–1805). He received his early education in Falmouth and later attended Dummer School in Byfield, Massachusetts.

As a boy, his home was destroyed in the burning of Falmouth by British Naval Commander Henry Mowat.  It is said that this action compelled Preble to join the Navy. It also contributed to his terrible temper later in life.

Career
In 1779, he was appointed to the Massachusetts State Navy, becoming an officer in the 26-gun ship Protector. Becoming a British prisoner when that ship was captured in 1781, he was held for a time in the infamous prison ship . On his release, he served in the Massachusetts Navy sloop Winthrop and led a boarding party to cut out a British brig at Castine, Maine.  At the opening of this action, Winthrop passed by the enemy ship so quickly that only Preble and 14 of his 45-man boarding party managed to get aboard.  As Winthrop came back around to make another pass, Winthrop'''s captain, George Little, asked Preble if he wanted more men.  Preble, realizing that he would lose the element of surprise if he disclosed his far weaker position, coolly replied, "No.  We have more than we want.  We stand in each others' way!"  Going below with pistols in hand, he caught a portion of the crew still in their hammocks.  Preble then announced that all were prisoners and that any resistance would be in vain.  As British soldiers on shore began firing, Preble worked his prize out to sea while the Winthrop turned to deliver a broadside in reply before making her escape.

United States Navy service
Fifteen years of merchant service followed his Revolutionary War career and, in April 1798, he was commissioned as a  lieutenant in the United States Navy. In January 1799, he assumed command of the 14-gun brig  and took her to the West Indies to protect American commerce during the Quasi-War with France. Commissioned as a captain in June 1799, he took command of the 32-gun frigate  in December and sailed from Newport, Rhode Island in January 1800 for the Pacific to convoy home a group of East Indiamen.

Upon his return, Preble announced to the Secretary of the Navy that he intended to retire from the Navy due to his health.  Not wanting to lose such an experienced and capable officer, the secretary decided to put Preble on indefinite sick leave until a good post could be found for him.

During this time, the United States was engaged in naval warfare with the city-state of Tripoli, whose corsairs were causing havoc amongst American merchantmen in the Mediterranean.  The U.S. Navy had sent squadrons under two commanders, Richard Dale and Richard Valentine Morris, to protect American interests in the region.  While Dale ran an effective blockade of Tripoli, the endless routine bored his officers.  Upon his return, Dale left the Navy over a promotion dispute.  The tenure of Richard Valentine Morris, on the other hand, was an utter fiasco, as Morris was neither an effective commander nor a very smart one.  Morris spent most of his time socializing in Gibraltar and Malta, and he managed to be taken hostage by the Bey of Tunis, who felt that the American did not give him an adequate farewell (the ransom was paid by the American and Danish consuls).  When he finally did arrive at Tripoli, he tried to play diplomat and sue for peace, which destabilized the strong negotiating position the Americans had been building up to that point.  When Morris returned home, he was stripped of his commission by President Thomas Jefferson without so much as a court-martial.

With Morris ordered home, President Jefferson needed a new officer to command the Mediterranean Squadron.  Bypassing several senior officers, Preble was asked to travel to Boston and ready  for duty in the Mediterranean.  He accepted, and was given a promotion to commodore along with his new ship.  He sailed on August 14, 1803.

To the Mediterranean

On September 10, Constitution was approaching Cadiz on a black, moonless night.  Suddenly, the dim silhouette of a warship loomed out of the darkness close aboard.  Preble immediately ordered Constitution cleared for action. Preble hailed her, only to receive a hail in return. He identified his ship as the United States frigate Constitution but received an evasive answer from the other ship. Preble replied: "I am now going to hail you for the last time. If a proper answer is not returned, I will fire a shot into you." The stranger returned, "If you give me a shot, I'll give you a broadside." Preble demanded that the other ship identify herself and the stranger replied, "This is His Britannic Majesty's Ship Donegal, 84 guns, Sir Richard Strachan, an English commodore." He then commanded Preble, "Send your boat on board." Preble was now devoid of all patience and exclaimed, "This is United States Ship Constitution, 44 guns, Edward Preble, an American commodore, who will be damned before he sends his boat on board of any vessel." And then to his gun crews: "Blow your matches, boys!" Before the incident escalated further, however, a boat arrived from the other ship and a British lieutenant relayed his captain's apologies. The ship was in fact not Donegal but instead , a 32-gun frigate. Constitution had come alongside her so quietly that Maidstone had delayed answering with the proper hail while she readied her guns. This act began the strong allegiance between Preble and the officers under his command, known as "Preble's boys", as he had shown that he was willing to defy a presumed ship of the line.Allen (1905), p. 142.

Second Battle of Tripoli Harbor

After signing a peace treaty with Morocco, Preble established a blockade off Tripoli. Stephen Decatur, William Bainbridge, Charles Stewart, Isaac Hull, Thomas Macdonough, James Lawrence, and David Porter served under his command at Tripoli.

Had Tripoli gained the use of Philadelphia, the entire blockade would have been wasted. Stephen Decatur and his younger brother, James Decatur, led the actual operation.

James Decatur was killed in the fighting later that year aboard one of the squadron's attack craft.

Over the course of his career, Preble helped establish many of the modern Navy's rules and regulations.  Described as a stern taskmaster, he kept high discipline upon the ships under his command.  He also dictated that his ships be kept in a state of readiness for any action while under sail, something many US naval officers at the time did not insist upon.  Future sea captains such as Decatur, Lawrence, and Porter took his procedures to heart at a time when the US Navy was highly unregulated.  Many of Preble's procedures became doctrine after the establishment of an official US Navy.  The officers serving under him during his career also went on to become influential in the Navy Department after his death, and together they proudly wore the unofficial title of "Preble's Boys". (When Preble took over command he discovered that his oldest officer was 30 and the youngest 15 years old. He therefore grumbled the Secretary of the Navy had given him "just a pack of schoolboys".)

Preble's Mediterranean cruise led directly to the US government's firm anti-negotiation stance.  Many Mediterranean states, including Tripoli, had been pirating American shipping vessels, ransoming the sailors, and demanding tribute to prevent future pirate attacks.  The tribute rose after each successful payment, as did the brutality and boldness of the attacks.

Later career
In September 1804, Commodore Preble requested relief due to a longtime illness.  He returned to the United States in February 1805 and became engaged in the comparably light duty of shipbuilding activities at Portland, Maine.  By congressional resolution in March 1805, a gold medal was struck and presented to Commodore Preble for the "gallantry and good conduct" of himself and his squadron at Tripoli.  President Jefferson offered him the Navy Department in 1806, but Preble declined appointment due to his poor health.

Preble died in Portland of a gastrointestinal illness on August 25, 1807.  He is buried in Eastern Cemetery in Portland, Maine.

Personal life
On March 17, 1801, Preble was married to Mary Deering (1770–1851) in Portland, Maine.  Mary was a daughter of Nathaniel Deering and Dorcas (née Milk) Deering. Together, they were the parents of one child:

 Edward Deering Preble (1806–1846), who married Sophia Elizabeth Wattles (1813–1889) in 1833.

Legacy
 Six ships of the United States Navy named 
 Preble Hall, the museum at the United States Naval Academy
 Preble County in Ohio
 Fort Preble at Spring Point in South Portland, Maine
 Preble Street in Portland, Maine
 Preble Street in South Portland, Maine
 Preble Street in Bremerton, Washington
 Preble Ave. in Norman, Oklahoma
 Preble Township, Minnesota
 Town of Preble, Cortland County, NY
 Preble, Wisconsin, a former town in Wisconsin, now part of the city of Green Bay
 Preble High School in Green Bay, Wisconsin

In popular culture
Preble appears as a character in the science fiction novel Time for Patriots, performing much as he did historically.
In the 1926 silent film Old Ironsides, Preble was portrayed by actor Charles Hill Mailes.
Preble appears as a character in the James L. Haley historical fiction novel "The Shores of Tripoli", .
Preble appears In "With Preble at Tripoli : a story of "Old Ironsides" and the Tripolitan war" Pub 1900, Author: James Otis, Publisher: Boston; Chicago : W.A. Wilde Co. Youth Fiction (WorldCat)
The Constitution under Preble's command makes a very brief appearance in C. S. Forester's novel Hornblower and the Hotspur.

References
Notes

Sources

Further reading
 Preble, George Henry. A genealogical Sketch of the First Three Generations of Prebles in America. Boston: David Clapp & Son, 1868. Excerpt, pp. 162–180.
 Pratt, Fletcher. Preble's Boys: Commodore Preble and the Birth of American Sea Power. New York: William Sloane, 1950.
 Gruppe, Henry. The Frigates. Time-Life books, 1979 
 McKee, Christopher. Edward Preble: A Naval Biography 1761-1807. Annapolis: Naval Institute Press, 1972. 
 London, Joshua E. Victory in Tripoli: How America's How America's War with the Barbary Pirates Established the U.S. Navy and Shaped a Nation. New Jersey: John Wiley & Sons, Inc., 2005. 
 White, William H. The Greater The Honor. Tiller Publishing, 2003. 
 Berube, Claude and Rodgaard, John. A Call to the Sea: Captain Charles Stewart of the USS Constitution''. Hamden Virginia: Potomac Books, Inc., 2006.

External links

 
USSPreble.org
Congressional Gold Medal 
VictoryInTripoli.com

1761 births
1807 deaths
American military personnel of the First Barbary War
American people of English descent
Continental Navy officers
United States Navy commodores
American military personnel of the Quasi-War
Congressional Gold Medal recipients
Military personnel from Portland, Maine
Tylden family
Burials at Eastern Cemetery
People of colonial Maine
The Governor's Academy alumni